Diana Ejaita is a Nigerian-Italian illustrator and textile designer.

Biography 
Ejaita was born in Italy. She studied fine art in France and Germany. As of 2020, she was based in Berlin, Germany, and Lagos, Nigeria.

In 2014, Ejaita started a fashion label, called WearYourMask, inspired by West African traditions and her Italo-Nigerian heritage.

In 2019, Ejaita's work was featured in a group exhibition at Berlin's Kunstgewerbemuseum (Museum of Decorative Arts), called Afro Futures. Fashion – Hair – Design. That same year, she illustrated a Google Doodle commemorating the 119th birthday of Funmilayo Ransome-Kuti, a Nigerian educator and women's rights activist. Ejaita has designed four covers for The New Yorker magazine.

Notes and references 

Year of birth missing (living people)
Living people
Nigerian illustrators
Italian women illustrators
Italian textile designers